The 1999 Island Games were the eighth Island Games, and were held in Gotland, from June 26 to July 2, 1999.

Medal table

Sports
The sports chosen for the games were:

External links
 Gotland 1999
 Island Games 1999

1999
International sports competitions hosted by Sweden
1999 in multi-sport events
1999 in Swedish sport
Multi-sport events in Sweden
Sport in Gotland County
June 1999 sports events in Europe
July 1999 sports events in Europe